Misha Timmins (born 19 June 1987) is an English actress.

Biography
Misha Timmins, from Worsley, attended Bridgewater School. Her first big break was in comedy drama series, The A to Z of Everything in 2005. She was also a cheerleader for Sale Sharks and Warrington Wolves.

Since 2013, Timmins regularly appears as Cindy in the BBC One sitcom, Still Open All Hours. In 2014, Timmins took on the role of Fat Brenda's daughter in Steve McDonald and Lloyd Mullaney's online Coronation Street spinoff, Streetcar Stories.

Filmography

References

External links
 

1987 births
Living people
21st-century English actresses
English television actresses